George Edward Pendray (May 19, 1901 – September 15, 1987) was an American public relations counselor, author, foundation executive, and founder of the American Interplanetary Society.

Personal life

Leatrice May Gregory (1905–1971), Pendray's first wife, was born in Colorado City, Texas, and graduated from the University of Wyoming in 1927, where she met Pendray. She was a syndicated newspaper columnist, from 1929 to 1944, and a partner with her husband in a public relations firm, Pendray & Company, from 1945 to 1970. In 1930 she was one of the twelve founders of the American Interplanetary Society and participated in its rocket experiments. The successor of that early organization is the American Institute of Aeronautics and Astronautics, which awards a Leatrice Gregory Pendray Scholarship to women undergraduates in science and engineering programs. A daughter, Guenever Lee Knapp (1932–1978), was one of the geologists who tested lunar samples at Princeton University.

Pendray's first had worked for the public schools of Absecon, New Jersey, as a music supervisor, before retiring. A resident of Jamesburg, New Jersey, Pendray died in Cranbury, New Jersey in 1987 at the age of 86. Surviving were his second wife, two daughters, two step-daughters, a brother, two sisters, ten grandchildren and three great-grandchildren.

Work

Pendray sometimes used the pen name "Gawain Edwards"; however, he usually wrote under his own name. He wrote  articles and fiction for many magazines. Amazing Stories praised Edward's The Earth Tube as "vividly and plausibly written," recommending it "to all lovers of scientific fiction".

 The Earth Tube, 1929
 A Rescue From Jupiter, 1932
 Men, Mirrors and Stars, 1935
 Book of Record of the Time Capsule, 1938
 City Noise, 1940; with Esther Goddard
 The Coming Age of Rocket Power, 1945
 Rocket Development 1948; co-editors Robert Goddard and Esther Goddard.
 The Guggenheim Medalists, 1964
 The Papers of Robert H. Goddard, 3 volumes, 1970; co-edited with Esther Goddard.

See also 
Frank H. Winter
Harold Horton Sheldon

References

Bibliography
 Who Was Who in America, Vol. 9 (1985–1989), p. 280. Chicago: Marquis, "Pendray, George Edward"
 New York Times Biographical Service, September 1987, p. 958
 Contemporary Authors, vol. 123 (1988), p. 299
 Encyclopedia of Science Fiction (1993), p. 919-920
 Collier's magazine, September 7, 1946, p. 89

External links

Prelude to the Space Age / The Rocket Societies: 1924-1940 by Frank H. Winter
G. Edward Pendray Papers at Seeley G. Mudd Manuscript Library, Princeton University

1901 births
1987 deaths
American public relations people
American science fiction writers
Early spaceflight scientists
American aerospace engineers
Businesspeople from Omaha, Nebraska
People from Jamesburg, New Jersey
People from Niobrara County, Wyoming
University of Wyoming College of Law alumni
American male short story writers
20th-century American novelists
American male novelists
20th-century American businesspeople
19th-century American short story writers
20th-century American short story writers
19th-century American male writers
20th-century American male writers
Engineers from New Jersey
20th-century American engineers
Members of the American Rocket Society